Evan Stewart may refer to:
 Evan Stewart (diver) (born 1975), Zimbabwean diver
 Evan Stewart (American football) (born 2003), American football player
 Evan George Stewart (1892–1958), British soldier and missionary